Women's 200m races for blind & visually impaired athletes at the 2004 Summer Paralympics were held in the Athens Olympic Stadium. Events were held in two disability classes.

T11

The T11 event consisted of 3 heats, 2 semifinals and A & B finals. It was won by Wu Chun Miao, representing .

1st Round

Heat 1
22 Sept. 2004, 11:30

Heat 2
22 Sept. 2004, 11:36

Heat 3
22 Sept. 2004, 11:42

Semifinals
Heat 1
23 Sept. 2004, 10:40

Heat 2
23 Sept. 2004, 10:46

Final Round
Final A
24 Sept. 2004, 17:20

Final B
24 Sept. 2004, 17:10

T12

The T12 event consisted of 4 heats, 2 semifinals and A & B finals. It was won by Assia El Hannouni, representing .

1st Round

Heat 1
19 Sept. 2004, 17:45

Heat 2
19 Sept. 2004, 17:51

Heat 3
19 Sept. 2004, 17:57

Heat 4
19 Sept. 2004, 18:03

Semifinals
Heat 1
20 Sept. 2004, 11:45

Heat 2
20 Sept. 2004, 11:51

Final Round
Final A
20 Sept. 2004, 18:20

Final B
20 Sept. 2004, 18:10

References

W
2004 in women's athletics